The 2014–15 Amkar Perm season was their 11th season in the Russian Premier League, the highest tier of association football in Russia, following promotion during the 2003 season. They will participate in the Russian Premier League and Russian Cup.

Slavoljub Muslin was appointed as the club's manager on 17 June 2014, take over from Konstantin Paramonov who was the club's caretaker manager following Stanislav Cherchesov leaving the club in April of the previous season. Muslin was fired as manager on 9 December 2014, with Gadzhi Gadzhiyev being appointed as his replacement on 30 December.

Squad

Transfers

Summer

In:

Out:

Winter

In:

Out:

Friendlies

Competitions

Russian Premier League

Results by round

Matches

Table

Russian Cup

Squad statistics

Appearances and goals

|-
|colspan="14"|Players who left Amkar Perm on loan:
|-
|colspan="14"|Players who left Amkar Perm during the season:

|}

Goal Scorers

Disciplinary record

Notes 
 YEKT time changed from UTC+6 to UTC+5 permanently on 26 October 2014.

References

FC Amkar Perm seasons
Amkar Perm